Albania participated in the Junior Eurovision Song Contest 2021 in Paris, France, with the song "Stand By You" performed by Anna Gjebrea. Its entry was selected through the national selection competition  organised by Radio Televizioni Shqiptar (RTSH) in October 2021. The country returned to the contest after an absence of one year due to the COVID-19 pandemic.

Background 

Prior to the 2021 contest, Albania had participated in the Junior Eurovision Song Contest six times since its first entry in 2012, only opting not to participate at the 2013, 2014 and 2020 contests. Albania has never won the contest, with their best result being in 2015, with the song "" by Mishela Rapo achieving fifth place with a score of 93 points. The country did not participate in 2020 due to the COVID-19 pandemic, but on 18 August 2021, RTSH announced that Albania will participate at the Junior Eurovision Song Contest 2021 following their one-year absence.

Before Junior Eurovision

Junior Fest 2021 
The Albanian broadcaster Radio Televizioni Shqiptar (RTSH) revealed in September 2022 that the Albanian representative will be chosen via the national selection competition .

Competing entries 
Interested artists from Albania and Kosovo were able to send in their applications, starting from 29 September 2021 until 15 October 2022. Only the final versions of the entries were accepted. Eventually 19 acts were selected to compete.

Final 
The final was broadcast on 23 October 2021 on 18:00 CET. The winner was selected exclusively by jury vote.

Promotion 
On 20 November, Anna Gjebrea travelled to North Macedonia to perform "Stand By You" on MRT 2, along with the Macedonian entrant Dajte Muzika.

At Junior Eurovision 

The Junior Eurovision Song Contest 2021 took place at La Seine Musicale in Paris, France, on 19 December 2021. After the opening ceremony, which took place on 13 December 2021, it was announced that Albania would perform eleventh on 19 December 2021, following Kazakhstan and preceding Ukraine.

At the end of the contest, Albania received 84 points, placing 14th out of 19 participating countries.

Voting

Detailed voting results

References 

2021
Albania
Junior Eurovision Song Contest
Junior Eurovision Song Contest